Khorrami (Persian: خرمی) is an Iranian surname that may refer to
Mohammad Khorrami (physicist) (born 1966), Iranian mathematical physicist
Mohammad Khorrami (wrestler), Iranian freestyle wrestler
Mohammad Mehdi Khorrami, American literary critic, writer and Iranologist
Reza Khorrami (born 1946), Iranian freestyle wrestler, brother of Mohammad

Persian-language surnames